Park Jung-woo is a South Korean actor.

Filmography

Film

Television series

Web series

References

External links 
 

 
1996 births
Living people
South Korean male television actors
21st-century South Korean male actors